Bernardino Vitali was an Albanian printer and publisher, active in Venice from 1494 to 1539. His printing workshop published more than 200 works of Venetian humanists in the first half of the 16th century.

Background and family  
Vitali was one of the albanesoti, Albanians who had settled in Venice mostly as refugees after the fall of Shkodra (northern Albania) to the Ottomans. The refugees had acquired Venetian citizenship and were integrated in the economic and social life of the republic. A close relative of Bernardino Vitali, Giovanni - possibly his grandson -  was a priest and calligrapher from Brescia. He lived in Vitali's house in San Zulian and produced a luxury copy of the code of regulation of the Scuola degli Albanesi in 1552.

Career 
Vitali opened his printing workshop in 1494 in Venice with his brother Matteo. The workshop operated until 1539. It was first located in the quarter of Santa Maria Formosa and later in San Zulian. In his career, Vitali published over 200 works in wide ranging subjects. He operated two other printing workshops in Rome and Rimini. His printing signature were the stylized Latin forms of his name: Bernardinus de Vitalibus or Bernardinus Venetus de Vitalibus. One of the first publications of the Vitali brothers was Enneades, an early attempt at writing universal history by Sabellicus. Vitali published many of the works of Albanian humanists who had settled in Italy after the Ottoman conquest of the country. He was the publisher of Marin Beçikemi and Marin Barleti, the first Albanian historian. Vitali was also Barleti's editor. One of the last publications in Vitali's career was Tabulae Anatomicae by Andries van Wesel with illustrations by Jan van Calcar.

See also 
 Marin Barleti
 Scuola degli Albanesi
 Siege of Shkodra
 Gregory of Durrës

References

Bibliography 

Republic of Venice printers
Venetian Albanians
15th-century Albanian people
16th-century Albanian people